Estórias contadas is a Capeverdean story published in 1998 by Germano Almeida.

The book contains chronicles published in the Portuguese newspaper Público.

External links
 O dia das calcas roladas at Editorial Caminho 
Estórias contadas at livrodatero.blogspot.com 

Books by Germano Almeida